This list of museums in Gloucestershire, England contains museums which are defined for this context as institutions (including nonprofit organizations, government entities, and private businesses) that collect and care for objects of cultural, artistic, scientific, or historical interest and make their collections or related exhibits available for public viewing. Also included are non-profit art galleries and university art galleries.  Museums that exist only in cyberspace (i.e., virtual museums) are not included.

Defunct museums
 Bristol Aero Collection, now Aerospace Bristol, at Filton, Bristol.
 Cinderbury Iron Age Experience, Clearwell
 Park House Toy Collectors Museum, Stow-on-the-Wold, closed in 2011
 Shambles Victorian Village, Newent

See also
 :Category:Tourist attractions in Gloucestershire

References

Gloucester Attractions
Tourism in South Gloucestershire
The Cotswolds: Attractions
Gloucestershire Revealed

 
Gloucestershire
Museums